Knutsford is a market town in the borough of Cheshire East, in Cheshire, England. The population at the 2011 Census was 13,191.

Knutsford's main town centre streets, Princess Street (also known locally as Top Street) and King Street lower down (also known as Bottom Street), form the hub of the town. At one end of the narrow King Street is an entrance to Tatton Park. The Tatton estate was home to the Egerton family, and has given its name to Tatton parliamentary constituency, which includes the neighbouring communities of Alderley Edge and Wilmslow.

Knutsford is near Cheshire's Golden Triangle, and on the Cheshire Plain between the Peak District to the east and the Welsh mountains to the west. Residents include Coronation Street actress Barbara Knox and footballers Peter Crouch, Sam Ricketts, Michael Jacobs and Phil Jagielka.

History 

Knutsford, situated in Cheshire, England, was recorded in the William the Conqueror's Domesday Book of 1086 as Cunetesford ("Canute's ford"). King Canute (Knútr in Old Norse) was the king of England (1016–1035) and later king of Denmark, Norway and parts of Sweden as well. Local tradition says that King Canute blessed a wedding that was taking place and forded the River Lily, which was said to be dangerous then, though other reports say it was the Birkin Brook at or near Booth Mill. The English Place-Name Society gives the name as being derived from the Old English for Knutr's ford or possibly hillock ford.

Knutsford Gaol was built in 1817 and later extended in 1853. It was not just built to house those committed of crimes but also to house those who could not be employed. In 1915, due to the low population and there being an ongoing World War the gaol was used as a military prison, for the detention of soldiers found guilty of committing offences. From 1916 it was used to house conscientious objectors who broke the Military Service Act 1916. In April 1916 there was an Easter Rising in Ireland, where rebels hoped to form an independent Ireland free from British rule. At least 600 rebels involved in that rising were transported to Knutsford by train from Holyhead and imprisoned in Knutsford Gaol. During this period many prisoners were not properly fed and resulted to eating grass and anything discarded by visitors. The gaol was demolished in 1934.

Knutsford was the place in which General George S. Patton, shortly before the Normandy invasion, delivered a speech perceived to be critical of the Soviets, and to have "slap(ped) the face of every one of the United Nations except Great Britain", which nearly ended his career.

After the Second World War, overspill housing estates were created in the town to accommodate families from Manchester. The Longridge overspill estate was built in Over Ward by Manchester City Council in the 1960s. At the end of the 20th century, all of the homes on the estate that had not already been sold to their occupants were transferred to Manchester Methodist Housing.

In 2005 Knutsford was named as the most expensive town to buy a house in Northern England, followed by nearby town Altrincham. There is an extremely large range of house prices in Knutsford, varying from approximately £175,000 to nearly £4,000,000 in late 2017. The average price is above £400,000.

Governance 
Knutsford has been under the unitary council of Cheshire East since April 2009. Prior to that Knutsford was in the Borough of Macclesfield.

Knutsford Town Council was created after the abolition of the urban district council in the Local Government Reorganisation of 1974. The town comprises four wards: Nether, Norbury Booths, Bexton and Over. Each ward returns three councillors except for Over which, owing to its size and greater population, returns six. Each councillor serves a four-year term. The current Town Council term started in May 2019 with 12 Conservative councillors and 3 Independents. The council is elected whole every four years.

The current Mayor of Knutsford and Chairman of the Town Council is Cllr Mike Houghton (Conservative).

Prior to Brexit in 2020, Knutsford was part of the North West region for the European Parliament.

Transport

Road 

Knutsford has excellent access to the motorway network, with junctions to the M6 (J19) and M56 (J7) motorways. However, this can also have disadvantages as the A50 which runs through Knutsford town centre follows a similar route to the M6 between Warrington and Stoke-on-Trent; this means that if the M6 is closed, due to an accident or roadworks, then a large volume of traffic transfers to the A50 and causes major traffic jams in Knutsford.

Rail 
Knutsford railway station is on the Mid-Cheshire Line that runs from Chester to Manchester Piccadilly, via Altrincham. The station was built in 1862 by the Cheshire Midland Railway (CMR). The CMR was absorbed into the Cheshire Lines Committee (CLC) in August 1867; this entity continued to serve Knutsford until nationalisation on 1 January 1948. The rail service to Manchester was re-routed via a slower route when the Manchester Metrolink trams took over the CLC direct line between Altrincham and Manchester; the heavy rail service was re-routed, via Stockport, to Manchester.

Currently, there is generally an hourly service in both directions. Trains operate to Northwich and Chester to the south-west; northbound services travel to Altrincham, Stockport and Manchester. There are extra trains to and from Stockport at peak times on weekdays. On Sundays, there is a service every two hours to Chester and a service every two hours to Southport via Manchester, Bolton and Wigan. The number of weekday peak trains to Manchester was cut back controversially in December 2008, to allow Virgin Trains West Coast to run extra services between Manchester and London.

Knutsford was expected to get a half-hourly train services to Northwich and Manchester (Monday to Saturday) by December 2017, with an increase in the Sunday frequency to hourly, but the promised additional services have failed to materialise.

Bus 
Since April 2018, bus service cutbacks has left Knutsford with just one regular bus route; this is an hourly Altrincham-Wilmslow-Knutsford service, with most continuing to either Macclesfield or Northwich, operating Monday to Saturdays only. There is also one bus per day to Warrington, Monday to Friday only. There is a 'Flexilink' (a flexible dial-a-ride service) available to people with disabilities or over 80 between 09:30 and 14:30 Monday to Friday.

In the past, it was common for one bus operator to run most or all of the bus routes in Knutsford. Crosville Motor Services ran buses across Cheshire and North Wales. Then later Star Line Travel took over services, who were based in Knutsford (at Stanley Road Industrial Estate) and Wythenshawe. Star Line Travel were taken over by North Western Road Car Company, who then later became part of Arriva Midlands. Star Line Travel's Knutsford depot closed, which made running bus routes in Knutsford an unattractive proposition for Arriva, who ceased to serve the town in January 2009. Star Line Travel's coach division was split between Bullocks Coaches and Selwyns Travel.

Current bus operators in Knutsford are D&G Bus and Warrington's Own Buses Monday to Saturday only.

Airport 
Manchester Airport is located five miles from Knutsford in the civil parish of Ringway; however, there is no direct bus or railway link to it from Knutsford.

Economy 

Knutsford town centre has several restaurants and pubs, coffee shops, boutiques, antique shops and art galleries. Knutsford has a medium-sized supermarket, Booths, also an Aldi, a Little Waitrose, a Sainsbury's Local, Olive and Sage. and two Co-Op stores (one on Princess Street and one on Parkgate Lane).

Tesco used to have a small shop in the town centre, which closed many years ago. The retailer had hoped to open a larger store on the edge of the town on Mobberley Road, but councillors in Mobberley objected to the proposed development, thinking it might result in more cars travelling through their village.

In 2008, Aldi announced plans to open a superstore in Knutsford, but construction did not begin until September 2012. The store officially opened in July 2013.

Barclays has a large campus site at Radbroke Hall on Toft Road just outside Knutsford, employing approximately 3000 staff in IT and support functions. Before Barclays purchased the site, it was owned by The Nuclear Power Group.

Religion 

St John the Baptist church is recorded in the National Heritage List for England as a designated Grade II* listed building. It is an active Anglican parish church in the located in the Church of England Diocese of Chester built between 1741 and 1744. It is in the Conservative Evangelical tradition of the Church of England and it has passed resolutions to reject the ordination of women.

St Cross is an Anglican church recorded in the National Heritage List for England as a designated Grade II* listed building, built between 1880 and 1887. Unlike St John's the church has had two female vicars since the Church of England approved the ordination of women.

St Vincent de Paul is a Catholic church in the Diocese of Shrewsbury. The current church opened in 1983, replacing an older church on the same site dating from the 1920s that was demolished due to subsidence. The first St Vincent de Paul church is still standing and has since been converted in to The Little Theatre.  The current church includes a plaque blessed by Pope John Paul II on his visit to Manchester in 1982. The church was modified in 1999 to include an apse with a stained glass window, which had previously been installed at Cross and Passion Sisters convent chapel, Maryfield, Dublin. The church claims the window was designed by Harry Clarke, although other sources state the window is too modern to have been designed by Clarke himself but it can still be attributed to the Harry Clarke Studio.

There is a Methodist church, a Unitarian church dating from 1689 where Elizabeth Gaskell is buried and a Gospel church, located in the old ticket office at Knutsford station.

Education 
Knutsford has six primary schools (one of these is a Roman Catholic school and another is a private school). Knutsford also has a high school: Knutsford Academy, which also has a Sixth Form. Some secondary school pupils from the town travel to schools in Altrincham, Hartford, Holmes Chapel, Hale and Macclesfield. Some sixth formers from the town travel to colleges in Northwich and Timperley. Macclesfield College run some adult education courses in Knutsford and Age UK run computer courses for the over 50s at Knutsford Library (as well as other libraries in Cheshire).

Sport 

Knutsford Cricket Club was established in 1881 and plays its home games on Mereheath Lane in the Cheshire Cricket Alliance.

Toft Cricket Club is located at Booths Park, Chelford Road. The Cricket Club gets its name from a neighbouring civil parish of Toft where the original ground was located when the club was established in 1928. Toft play in the ECB Premier Division of the Cheshire County Cricket League It won the National Village Championship trophy at Lords in 1989.

Knutsford Hockey Club plays its home games at Knutsford Leisure Centre and are based at the Crosstown Bowling Club on Chelford Road. This 100-year-old club runs 3 men's teams, a ladies team, a mixed team and a badgers team. The Men's 1st XI play in Division 1 of The North West Hockey League

Knutsford Football Club, formed in 1948, play at their Manchester Road ground. The club has two Saturday teams, the first team in the Cheshire League and the second or A team in the Altrincham and District League. Two Associated Veterans teams also play on Sundays in the Cheshire Veterans League. In 2015, a youth team has been fielded again after a break of 127 years.

Every 10 years Knutsford hosts an international three-hour endurance race for Penny-farthing bicycles.

Culture and community 

There are many events in and around the town each year including the May Day festivities, The RHS Flower show at Tatton Park and the Cheshire County Show in the parish of Tabley, near Knutsford.

The annual Knutsford Royal May Day festival is where hundreds of people parade through the streets, and the May Queen is crowned. During the May Day weekend there is also a funfair run on ‘The Heath’ (a large field near the centre of Knutsford) where the crowning of the May Queen also takes place) This is said to be one of the largest travelling funfairs in the UK, with a large selection of rides and games to enjoy. 

Local folklore claims that Edward "Highwayman" Higgins had a tunnel running under The Heath, where he hid his booty.

The Knutsford Guardian, established in 1860, is the only weekly paid-for paper dedicated to covering the town and its surrounding villages. The newspaper is teamed with the Northwich, Middlewich, and Winsford Guardian.

There is a May Day custom, still observed today, of "sanding the streets" in Knutsford. The streets are decorated with coloured sands in patterns and pictures. Tradition has it that King Cnut, while fording the River Lily, threw sand from his shoes into the path of a wedding party, wishing the newly wed as many children as the grains of sand at their feet. The custom can be traced to the late 1600s. Queen Victoria, in her journal of 1832 recorded: "we arrived at Knutsford, where we were most civilly received, the streets being sanded in shapes which is peculiar to this town".

Knutsford was the model for Elizabeth Gaskell's novel Cranford. She lived in the town for some time, on what is now known as Gaskell Avenue, and she is buried in the Unitarian Chapel graveyard. Many of the places and people described in her books can be identified as being based on places and people in the town. In 2007 the BBC adapted the novel and produced a popular TV series Cranford. Despite several references to Knutsford, including King Street and The Heath, the TV adaptation was actually filmed in Lacock, Wiltshire. Notably, in 1987 Legh Road in Knutsford, designed by Richard Harding Watt, doubled for Colonial Shanghai in the opening scenes from Steven Spielberg's film Empire of the Sun. A Gaskell protégé who died in Knutsford in 1859 was the once-popular novelist Selina Davenport, who abandoned writing despairingly in 1834 and kept a tiny Knutsford shop instead.

Knutsford Amateur Drama Society was established in 1925 and moved to its premises in Queen Street, Knutsford shortly after the end of the Second World War. Now known by the name of the building it occupies, Knutsford Little Theatre continues to produce a selection of plays each year, including an annual pantomime.

Knutsford Heritage Centre is situated in a 17th-century timber-framed building just off King Street, which was a blacksmith's forge in the 19th century. It has a museum, garden, shop and gallery featuring various exhibitions, talks and events, and walking tours are also available. On permanent exhibition are the May Queen's dress shoes and crown from 1887.

Scenes from the George C. Scott film Patton were filmed in the centre of Knutsford, in front of Knutsford Town Hall. The building was designed by Alfred Waterhouse, and for much of the 20th century was home to Knutsford Boys' Club and latterly a furniture show room and post office. It is now home to the Lost & Found pub and cocktail bar.

Notable people

17th and 18th century 

 Sir Peter Leycester, 1st Baronet (1614 in Nether Tabley – 1678), an English antiquarian and historian
 Edward Penny RA (1714 in Knutsford – 1791), an English portrait and historical painter, one of the founder members of the Royal Academy
 James Neild (1744 in Knutsford – 1814), an English jeweller, prison reformer and  philanthropist
 John Leicester, 1st Baron de Tabley (1762 in Tabley House – 1827), an English landowner, politician, amateur artist and patron of the arts
 Selina Davenport (1779–1859), an English novelist until 1834 when she ran a tiny shop in Knutsford
 Sir Henry Holland, 1st Baronet FRS (1788 in Knutsford – 1873), a British physician and travel writer

19th century 

 Edmund Sharpe (1809 in Knutsford – 1877), an English architect, architectural historian, railway engineer and sanitary reformer
 Elizabeth Gaskell (1810–1865), an English novelist, biographer and short story writer, grew up in Knutsford
 Evelyn Gleeson (1855 in Knutsford – 1944), an English embroidery, carpet and tapestry designer
 Sir Henry Royce, 1st Baronet OBE (1863–1933), an English engineer, car designer and joint founder of the Rolls-Royce company. Lived in Knutsford 1898–1912
 Brigadier-General Sir Ernest Makins KBE CB DSO (1869–1959), a British military officer, statesman and Conservative MP for Knutsford 1922–1945
 Frank Boyd Merriman, 1st Baron Merriman GCVO OBE PC (1880 in Knutsford – 1962), a British Conservative politician and judge
 Sir Edward Peel KBE, DSO, MC (1884 in Knutsford – 1961), a British army officer, businessman, amateur sportsman and big-game fisherman. Lived mainly in Egypt.

20th century 

 Lieutenant-Colonel Sir Walter Henry Bromley-Davenport TD DL (1903–1989), Conservative MP for Knutsford 1945–1970
 Barrie Cooke (1931 in Knutsford – 2014), an Irish abstract expressionist painter
 Martin Edwards (born 1955 in Knutsford), a British crime novelist, critic and solicitor
 John Bason (born 1957 in Knutsford), a British businessman, also on the Board of Trustees of Voluntary Service Overseas
 Robert Heaton (1961 in Knutsford – 2004), an English musician, drummer in the English rock band New Model Army
 Edward Timpson CBE (born 1973 in Knutsford), a British Conservative politician. MP for Crewe and Nantwich 2008–2017 and for Eddisbury since 2019
 Tom Walker (born 1991), Brit Award-winning singer-songwriter, grew up in Knutsford
 Matthew Falder (born 1988–1989), a convicted English paedophile and blackmailer, lived in Knutsford

21st century 
 Ruby Barnhill (born 2004 in Knutsford), an English child actress, played the lead role in Steven Spielberg's 2016 film The BFG

Sport 
 John Payne (1828 in Knutsford), a cricketer who played for the North of England cricket team and Manchester
 Tom Barber (1894 in Knutsford – 1936), an English professional golfer, twice finished in the top 10 in The Open Championship.
 Lucy Morton (1898 at New Tatton – 1980), an English competition swimmer, gold medallist in the 200-metre breaststroke event in the 1924 Summer Olympics
 Emma Davies (born 1978 in Knutsford), a British Olympic cyclist, competed in the 2000 and 2004 Summer Olympics
 Aaron Wilbraham (born 1979 in Knutsford), an English professional footballer and manager with over 500 pro appearances; he last played for Rochdale

See also 

Listed buildings in Knutsford

References

Notes

Bibliography

Further reading

External links 

Knutsford Town Council
Knutsford Market
Cheshire Market Towns
Knutsford Guardian – printed news
Knutsford Times – online news
Knutsford Heritage Centre

 
Towns in Cheshire
Civil parishes in Cheshire